Martin Haarahiltunen (born 2 October 1990) is a world champion speedway rider from Sweden.

Speedway career 

Haarahiltunen became a world champion when winning the Individual Ice Speedway World Championship in the 2022 Individual Ice Racing World Championship. He won the title by virtue of overtaking the championship leader and strong favourite Johann Weber in the final round. Haarahiltunen completed a six race maximum while Weber crashed and was injured.

His best placing previously was finishing in fourth place during the 2018 Individual Ice Racing World Championship and is also a three times silver medal winner at the World Team Championships (2018, 2019, 2020).

References 

Swedish speedway riders
1990 births
Living people